is a Japanese track and road cyclist, who currently rides for UCI track team Ciel Bleu Kanoya.

He won the silver medal in the team pursuit at the 2016 Asian Cycling Championships.

Major results
2014
 National Track Championships
1st  Scratch
1st  Madison (with Eiya Hashimoto)
2016
 2nd  Team pursuit, Asian Track Championships
2017
 3rd  Team pursuit, Asian Track Championships
2018
 1st  Team pursuit, National Track Championships
2019
 1st  Points race, National Track Championships
2021
 1st  Team pursuit, National Track Championships

References

External links

1993 births
Living people
Japanese track cyclists
Japanese male cyclists
Place of birth missing (living people)